Irreplaceable (original title: Médecin de campagne), released in some countries as The Country Doctor, is a 2016 French dramedy film directed and co-written by Thomas Lilti. It stars François Cluzet and Marianne Denicourt.

Synopsis 
Jean-Pierre Werner, a country doctor who has lived his life devoted to his job, finds out he is suffering from an inoperable brain tumor. His doctor advises him to retire and rest. Soon thereafter, a lady doctor from the city arrives to help him with his practice, but the arrangement unsettles Jean-Pierre, who considers himself indispensable.

Cast 
 François Cluzet as Jean-Pierre Werner
 Marianne Denicourt as Nathalie Delezia
 Isabelle Sadoyan as Werner's mother
 Félix Moati as Vincent Werner
 Patrick Descamps as Francis Maroini
 Christophe Odent as Norès
 Guy Faucher as Mr Sorlin
 Margaux Fabre as Ninon
 Julien Lucas as Ninon's boyfriend
 Yohann Goetzmann as Alexis
 Philippe Bertin as Guy
 Géraldine Schitter as Fanny

Release 
The film was released in France in 2016.

It was released in Australian cinemas as The Country Doctor in March 2017.

Accolades

References

External links 
 

2016 films
2016 comedy-drama films
Family medicine in France
2010s French-language films
French comedy-drama films
Medical-themed films
Films directed by Thomas Lilti
2010s French films